Juju is one of the seven districts on the island of Rotuma, a dependency of Fiji. It includes the villages of Juju, Toai, and Haga.

References

Districts of Rotuma